Redemption song(s) may refer to:

Music
 "Redemption Song", a 1972 song from the Toots and the Maytals albums Slatyam Stoot and Funky Kingston
 "Redemption Song", a 1980 song from the Bob Marley album Uprising
 "Redemption Song", a 1989 song from the Majek Fashek album Prisoner of Conscience
 Redemption Songs, a 2005 album by Jars of Clay
Redemption Songs  (Sons of Korah album), a 2000 album by Sons of Korah
Redemption Songs: Unearthed, Vol. 3, a 2003 album by Johnny Cash

Books
 Redemption Song (book), a book about Barack Obama's 2008 presidential election campaign by Niall Stanage
Redemption Song: The Ballad of Joe Strummer, a 2006 biographical book

Television
 Redemption Song (TV series), a 2008 American reality show where female contestants compete to become a rockstar
 Redemption Song, an episode from Degrassi: The Next Generation (season 5)

See also
 Redemption (disambiguation) § Songs, for songs titled "Redemption"